British hip hop musician Kano has released six studio albums, three EPs, six mixtapes and nineteen  singles.

Albums

Studio albums

Mixtapes

 2005: Beats + Bars
 2007: Kano Mixtape
 2008: MC No. 1
 2010: Jack Bauer: The 7 Day Edition
 2011: Girls Over Guns
 2012: Jack Bauer 2.4

EPs

 2008: 48 Bars Vol. 1 EP
 2011: Not 4 the A List EP
 2012: Wavy EP

Singles

As lead artist

As featured artist

Promotional singles

Other charted songs

References 

Hip hop discographies
Discographies of British artists